Vallivue School District is a school district in Idaho. It is mostly based in Caldwell and Nampa, with locations in Canyon County. The Vallivue boundaries go as far as the Snake River. The Vallivue district boundaries border Middleton School District to the north, Nampa School District to the south, Caldwell School District to the northwest, and West Ada School District to the east.

History 
Vallivue School District had its early beginnings as thirteen rural schoolhouses scattered throughout the countryside in Canyon County. These schoolhouses housed students from Kindergarten to 8th grade. In 1961, the school boards came together to form Vallivue School District. The main building was the high school, and the 8th grade building was the middle school. Many teachers that graduated Vallivue High School are teachers at the Vallivue Middle School.

List of schools

Elementary schools
Birch Elementary (Birch)
Desert Springs Elementary (Desert)
Central Canyon Elementary (Central)
East Canyon Elementary (East)
Lakevue Elementary (Lakevue)
West Canyon Elementary (West)
Skyway Elementary (Skyway)

Middle schools
Sage Valley Middle School (Sage)
Vallivue Middle School (The middle school)
Summitvue Middle School (Summitvue)

High schools
Vallivue High School
Vallivue Academy (alternative high school)
Ridgevue High School 
Vallivue also has one charter school, Thomas Jefferson Charter School, in their district. Vallivue also has a virtual school, serving K-12. All of the schools are located in Caldwell except for Ridgevue High School, Sage Valley Middle School, Birch Elementary, Desert Springs Elementary, and East Canyon Elementary which are located in Nampa. The district office is in Caldwell as well.

References

External links 
Vallivue website

School districts in Idaho
School districts established in 1964
Education in Canyon County, Idaho
Caldwell, Idaho
1964 establishments in Idaho